Sekiya may refer to:

Sekiya Seikei (1855–1896), Japanese geologist and seismologists
Masanori Sekiya (born 1949), racing car driver, Le Mans winner
Ryōichi Sekiya (born 1967), Japanese ultramarathon and marathon runner
Ryota Sekiya (born 1991), former Nippon Professional Baseball player
Shuichi Sekiya (born 1969), Japanese biathlete

See also
Sekiya Kinen, a 1600m horse race for Thoroughbreds aged three and over
Keisei Sekiya Station, a railway station on the Keisei Main Line in Adachi, Tokyo, Japan
Sekiya Station (Nara), a railway station in Kashiba, Nara Prefecture, Japan
Sekiya Station (Niigata), a train station in Chūō-ku, Niigata, Niigata Prefecture, Japan